Narovchat is the name of several rural localities in Penza Oblast, Russia:
Narovchat, Narovchatsky District, Penza Oblast, a selo in Narovchatsky Selsoviet of Narovchatsky District
Narovchat, Tamalinsky District, Penza Oblast, a village in Volche-Vrazhsky Selsoviet of Tamalinsky District